Arthanāreeswarā temple aka Thirukodimāda Chenkundrūr(Tamil:     
திருக்கொடிமாடச் செங்குன்றூர்) is an ancient Hindu temple, located in Tiruchengode, in the southern Indian state of Tamil Nadu. The temple is dedicated to Arthanāreeswarā,  a form of the Hindu deity Shiva combined with his consort Parvati. Also called asMādhorubāgan and Ammaiyappan (mother-father). The famous Chenkottu Velavar Temple, dedicated to Lord Murugan, is also situated on the same hill.

History
It is one of the shrines of the 275 Paadal Petra Sthalams praised in the Thevaram hymns of the Saivite saints. Both Thirugnansambandar and Arunagirinathar have composed hymns celebrating the temple. In the ancient work Silapathikaram the place is mentioned by the name 'Neduvelkundru'.

The temple is also the subject of a popular composition by Muttuswami Dīkshitar, Arthanāreeshwaram, set in the ragam Kumudakriya.

Important renovations were made during the reigns of the Chola, Pandya and Nayak kings, and by a British colonial officer, Davis, whose image can be found in the Mukkoottu Vinayagar temple.

The temple is maintained and administered by the Hindu Religious and Charitable Endowments Department of the Government of Tamil Nadu.

Legends

It is believed that Adi Kesava Perumāl, a form of Vishnu enshrined here, instructed Parvati on the Kedara Gowri Vratam, which she performed to unite with Shiva as Ardhanareeswarar.

Once Vishnu, Brahma, Indra and the sage Bhringi went to Kailash to worship Shiva. Everyone first paid their respects to Parvati and then proceeded to Shiva. However, Bhringi directly marched to Shiva. Parvati, annoyed by his act, sucked the flesh from the sage's body to stop him proceeded. Shiva blessed Bhringi with a third leg, to counter Parvati's curse. With her austerities, Parvati appeased Shiva to grant position in his body, thus leading to the half-male, half-female manifestation as Ardhanareeswarar.

Another legend states that there was a battle between the serpent Adishesha and the wind-god Vayu for superiority. The sages set a challenge that Adishesha had to cling to Mount Meru and Vayu has to release him by his power. Adishesha succeeded. Vayu, out of anger, stopped the airflow in the world; as a result all living beings fainted. The sages convinced Vayu to release his hold. By the sudden release of air by Vayu lead the top of the mountain with the head of Adisesha, thrown into earth on three places with flesh and blood and making it red and thus the name Chengodu. There is a 60 ft long snake carved on the hill, and hence the name as Nagamalai. Sambandar composed the Tiruneelakandapathigam here, to help rid fellow travellers of an affliction. Saint Arunagirinathar has also composed Thirupugazh on Lord Subramanya here. Muthuswamy Deekshitar has sung of this shrine in Ardhanareeswaram in Kumudakriya.

Architecture

The sacred hill is about 650 ft. high, and a climb of 1156 steps leads worshippers to the temple at its peak. The hill is called 'Nagagiri' in the Thevaram hymns and is also known by many other names like Chemmalai, Panimalai, Nandimalai, Uragaverpu. The hill contains about 350 acres of land, which lies 2000 ft about sea level.

On top of the hill, the main gopuram (Tower) with 5 tiers is on the north side of the hill. The compound wall of the temple is 260 feet length east to west and 170 feet length north to south. 

The main shrine is for Lord Shiva known as Maathoru Paagar and the Ambal his consort is known Baagampiriyaalammai. The image of the main deity is 6 feet in height, the right half of the image as male and left half of the image as female. Hence the main deity is also known as Ardhanareeswarar.

Subramanya known as Chengottu Velar is located on a flat surface atop the hill. This Chengottu Velar shrine is on the back side of the main sanctum sanctorum. The Theertham in this temple is called Sangu Theertham. Although the sanctum faces the West, entrance to it is from the South. There is a water spring at the foot of the image, which is said to have been divinely manifested "Uli Padaa Uruvam" ('sculptured without tools'), also known to be Navabashana type. There are many mandapams on the way for people who alight steps to take rest. The sculptures found in the mandapam in front of the Chengottu Velar shrine are of intricate designs and workmanship. "Artha Jaama Pooja" the late night worship service is considered to be of importance in this shetram. New moon days are also considered to be special events. The annual festival is celebrated in the Tamil month of Vaikasi. There is a shrine for Adikesava in the temple.

Along the path are 11 mandapams, providing shelter to pilgrims climbing up the hill. The first is the Sengunthar Mudaliyar Mandapam, then the Kālathi Swamigal Mandapam, Thirumudiyar Mandapam and Thailee Mandapam.

One of the 64 manifestations of Shiva, representing the unity of Shiva and Parvati, is enshrined in this revered hill temple of great significance, accessible by a motorable road.

Ancient walls, mandapams and sculptured pillars (now in a state of disrepair) add to the awe that this temple perpetuates, on top of the hill. The motorway and the renovated Rajagopuram are of recent origin.

Although the sanctum faces the West, entrance to it is from the South. A majestic image of Ardanareeshwarar adorns the sanctum. There is a water spring at the foot of the image which is said to have been divinely manifested (Uli Padaa Uruvam). There are inscriptions here from the times of Parantaka Chozha, Gangaikonda Chozha, the Vijayanagar and Mysore Kings and the Nayaks.

Arupatham Padi
Along the path are 60 steps called the Arubadam Padi (அறுபதாம் படி), which are considered to have special significance, and are mentioned by Arunagirināthar.

Ucchi sivalingam
The Ucchi Pillaiyar shrine is found about 425 feet further up and is dedicated to Ganesha and to the lingam form of Shiva. On the west of it lies a stone called Varadikal, Maladi kal, or Vandhya Paatana Sikara. Couples offer worship at this shrine in the hope of being blessed with a child.

தத்வ நாற்பத் தெட்டு நாற்பத் தெட்டு மேற்றுத் திடமேவும்
தர்க்க சாத்ரத் தக்க மார்க்கச் சத்ய வாக்யப் பெருமாளே

Gopuram
The north facing, 84.5 ft tall Thirumalai Gopuram was built by Krishna Devarayar in 1512 and the basement (kalkarar) was built during the reign of Sadāsiva Mahārāyar. The 84.5 feet tall Majestic Rajagopuram of this hill temple faces north and its five stages contain fine pieces of embossed figures.

Theertham
Tiruchengode, one of the most important religious places in South India, is said to have 108 Theerthangal or water bodies.

Of these, the Ammaiyappar Theertham is the most important one, as it is found at the feet of Lord Arthanareeswarar.

Festivals
The temple is counted as one of the temples built on the banks of River Kaveri. The most important festival is the annual chariot festival of the Sengottuvelavar temple, which occurs for 15 days in the month of  Vaikāsi. The special feature of the festival is that four separate chariots are used to carry the processional deities through the streets. The first chariot carries Lord Ganesha, the second Sengottuvelavar (Murugan), the third is used for Arthanāreeshwara and the last for Adikeshava Perumāl (Vishnu). These chariots are also of considerable historic importance: the largest, that of Arthanāreeshwara was donated to the temple by Nagamalai Gounder in 1699, the chariot of Sengothuvevar was donated by Chennaraja Chikendar in 1628 and the remaining two were made by Kondabhupathi, the ruler of Kongunādu, in 1628.

Girivalam
Girivalam is the practice of circumambulating the sacred hill by foot, which is performed by large crowds on full-moon days. The route around the hill is about 7 km long and takes about 1.5 hours to cover the distance.

References

External links

Official Website
Arthanareeswarar.com Website 
 http://www.templenet.com/Tamilnadu/s110.html
 https://web.archive.org/web/20111006074755/http://www.shivatemples.com/knaadu/kn2.html

Hindu temples in Namakkal district
Shiva temples in Namakkal district
Padal Petra Stalam